The 2011–12 Butler Bulldogs men's basketball team represented Butler University in the 2011–12 NCAA Division I men's basketball season. Their head coach was Brad Stevens, serving his 5th year. The Bulldogs played their home games at Hinkle Fieldhouse, which has a capacity of approximately 10,000 and a playing floor that was renovated during the summer of 2011. This was Butler's last season competing in the Horizon League.

In each of the previous two seasons, the Bulldogs reached the NCAA championship game after winning the Horizon League regular season, and Butler was the favorite to win the Horizon League for a sixth consecutive season in spite of losing senior and four-year starter Matt Howard to graduation and junior Shelvin Mack to the NBA draft.   Analyst Jeff Borzello of CBS Sports explained "Butler loses a lot of talent from last season, but it's still tough to choose against the Bulldogs."   The Bulldogs add Roosevelt Jones, a three-star recruit ranked in the 2011 Rivals 150 and the 33rd best freshman small forward in the nation, and also add Australian guard Jackson Aldridge, who "drew rave reviews playing in the U-19 world championships."  Further, the Bulldogs add Kameron Woods, a two-star recruit and the 62nd best power forward in the nation according to ESPN.com. The final member of the recruit class is Andy Smeathers, a "local kid who knows how to make shots."

2011 recruiting class

Roster

Source:  2011–12 Butler Men's Basketball Roster

Schedule

|-
!colspan=12 style="background:#13294B; color:#FFFFFF;"| Exhibition

|-
!colspan=12 style="background:#13294B; color:#FFFFFF;" | Non-Conference Regular Season

|-
!colspan=12 style="background:#13294B; color:#FFFFFF;" | Horizon League Play

|-
!colspan=12 style="background:#13294B; color:#FFFFFF;"|Horizon League tournament

|-
!colspan=12 style="background:#13294B; color:#FFFFFF;"|College Basketball Invitational

|-

Source:  2011–12 Butler Bulldogs men's basketball schedule

Rankings

Preseason

Departures

Preseason rankings

Preseason awards

Preseason game capsules
11/2 – Butler vs Northern State

Butler Falls On Buzzer-Beater
Senior guard Alex Thomas nailed a three-point field goal at the buzzer to cap a 12–0 closing run and lift visiting Northern State to a 53–50 victory over Butler in an exhibition game at Hinkle Fieldhouse on Wednesday, Nov. 2.  The game was Butler's first test against outside competition.  The Wolves battled back from a 50–41 deficit in the final four minutes.  A steal and layup by Seth Bachand and a conventional three-point play by Trent Zomer cut the margin to 50–46 with 2:56 left.  Forward Collin Pryor followed with back-to-back baskets to tie the game at 50–50 with 0:52 left.  Butler's Andrew Smith, who led all scorers with 19 points missed the front end of a one-and-one free throw situation with 0:38 left, setting up the final play.  Following a timeout, Northern State held the ball for a final shot and Thomas delivered from the top of the key as the final buzzer sounded.

11/4 – Butler vs Franklin

Butler Rolls Past Franklin In Exhibition Tilt
Junior Andrew Smith led four players in double-figures with 19 points in 17 minutes and Butler pulled away to a 91–53 victory over visiting Franklin in an exhibition game at Hinkle Fieldhouse on Saturday, Nov. 5.  The game was Butler's final preseason test.  Smith, who also led Butler with 19 points in a 53–50 loss to Northern State three days earlier, hit seven of nine shots in his brief stint, including one of two from beyond the three-point arc.  The 6–11 center was perfect on four free throw attempts, and he added three assists.  There was plenty of support for the Butler scoring leader.  Junior Chase Stigall (below left) hit four of six shots from three-point range and finished with 14 points, while freshman Andrew Smeathers came off the bench and hit three of five three-pointers and finished with 11 points.  Freshman guard Jackson Aldridge had 10 points in a reserve stint.

Regular season

11/12 – Butler at Evansville

Butler Falls In Overtime At Evansville
Junior Colt Ryan tied the game with a free throw in regulation and then scored his team's final six points in overtime to lift host Evansville to an 80–77 overtime victory over Butler in the season-opener for both teams at the new Ford Center on Saturday, Nov. 12. Between Ryan's clutch points, the game took a bizarre twist. Butler led 69–68 with Evansville in possession and 0:15 remaining.  The Aces' Ned Cox missed a jump shot with 0:07 remaining and there was a loose ball scramble for the rebound.  Butler's Jackson Aldridge was whistled for a foul with 0:00.9 left, sending Ryan to the line.  The Evansville scoring leader missed the first free throw, but made the second to tie the game. Butler's Emerson Kampen then threw a full-court pass to center Andrew Smith, who caught the ball and laid it in at the buzzer for an apparent game-winning shot.  The game officials huddled, and claimed a foul was called before the shot, sending Smith to the free throw line with 0:00.2 left.  Smith missed both shots, forcing the overtime period.

11/15 – Butler vs Chattanooga

Bulldogs Win Home-Opener
Junior Andrew Smith recorded his second career double-double and Butler used a staunch defensive effort to dispatch visiting Chattanooga, 57–46, in the Bulldogs' 2011–12 home-opener at Hinkle Fieldhouse on Tuesday, Nov. 15.  The game was Butler's first in the five-team Hoosier Invitational. Smith (below), a 6–11 center, led both teams with 16 points, hitting five of eight shots from the field and five of seven from the free throw line.  He also led both teams with 10 rebounds, one off his career-high.  His performance followed a 21-point effort in Butler's tough season-opening double-overtime loss at Evansville. But it was Butler's defensive effort that claimed the spotlight.  The Bulldogs limited Chattanooga (0–2), a team favored in the Southern Conference, to just 19 points in the second half.  The Mocs scored just six points in the final 13 minutes of the contest.

11/19 – Butler vs #8/7 Louisville

Second Half Lifts No. 7 Louisville Past Butler
Seniors Kyle Kuric and Chris Smith combined for 32 points and sparked a late second half run that lifted No. 7 Louisville to a 69–53 victory over Butler at Hinkle Fieldhouse on Saturday, Nov. 19.  The win boosted the Cardinals to 3–0 on the season, while Butler fell to 1–2.  Butler held a 41–40 advantage with 12 minutes remaining, when Kuric and Smith ignited a decisive 16–4 run.  Kuric scored 10 points in the six-minute run, while Smith added the other six to give the Cardinals a 56–45 advantage.  Butler never got closer than nine points in the final six minutes.

References

Butler Bulldogs Men's
Butler Bulldogs men's basketball seasons
Butler
Butl
Butl